Ermando Malinverni (30 October 1919 – 5 August 1993) was an Italian footballer who played as a midfielder. On 9 November 1947, he represented the Italy national football team on the occasion of a friendly match against Austria in a 5–1 away loss.

References

1919 births
1993 deaths
People from Vercelli
Italian footballers
Italy international footballers
Association football midfielders
Modena F.C. players
Atalanta B.C. players
A.S.D. La Biellese players